Events from the year 1774 in Germany.

Establishments 
 Philanthropinum

Births 
 Ferdinand Oechsle
 Gottfried Daniel Krummacher
 Ferdinand Weerth
 Johann Jakob Bernhardi
 Johann Wilhelm Andreas Pfaff

Deaths 
 Johann Heinrich Zopf
 Karl Heinrich von Bogatzky
 Johann Georg Schröpfer
 Christian Wilhelm Ernst Dietrich
 Johann Jakob Reiske
 Susanne von Klettenberg

1770s in the Holy Roman Empire